Jan Bos (born 29 March 1975) is a Dutch former speedskater and sprint cyclist. In the late 1990s he was world champion in speed skating and he competed in the 1998, 2002, 2006 and 2010 Winter Olympics.

Speed skater
In 1998 Bos both became the world champion sprint and won the silver medal that year in the 1000 meter sprint during the Winter Olympics in Nagano. He won the silver medal on that same distance in Salt Lake City.

He competed at the 2004 Summer Olympics in Athens in the team sprint track cycling event, together with his brother Theo Bos, who won the silver at the individual sprint, and Teun Mulder. The Dutch finished sixth after being knocked out by Japan.

Bos ended his career as a competitive speed skater in 2011.

Cyclist
In 2012 Bos (in cooperation with the Human Power Team from Delft) tried to become the fastest cyclist in the world during the World Human Powered Speed Challenge in Battle Mountain, Nevada. At the time, the International Human Powered Vehicle Association record was 133 km/h, held by the Canadian Sam Whittingham. Bos used a recumbent bicycle specially developed for the occasion by students of the Delft University of Technology and the Vrije Universiteit Amsterdam, but only managed a maximum speed of 126.5 km/h. In September 2013, his teammate Sebastiaan Bowier did manage to break the record, reaching a speed of 133.78 kilometres per hour (83.13 mph)

Records

Personal records

Bos specialized in the sprint events but does have an Adelsalender score of 156.494

Source: www.sskating.com & SpeedskatingResults.com

World records

Source: SpeedSkatingStats.com

Tournament overview

 DNF = Did not finish
 DQ = Disqualified
source:

See also
 List of Dutch Olympic cyclists

References

External links
 
 Jan Bos at SpeedSkatingStats.com
 
 

 
 

1975 births
Living people
People from Harderwijk
Dutch male speed skaters
Dutch male cyclists
Dutch track cyclists
Speed skaters at the 1998 Winter Olympics
Speed skaters at the 2002 Winter Olympics
Speed skaters at the 2006 Winter Olympics
Speed skaters at the 2010 Winter Olympics
Cyclists at the 2004 Summer Olympics
Olympic cyclists of the Netherlands
Olympic speed skaters of the Netherlands
Olympic silver medalists for the Netherlands
Olympic medalists in speed skating
World record setters in speed skating
Medalists at the 2002 Winter Olympics
Medalists at the 1998 Winter Olympics
Sportspeople from Gelderland
World Single Distances Speed Skating Championships medalists
Dutch speed skating coaches
Dutch sports coaches
Cyclists from Gelderland
20th-century Dutch people
21st-century Dutch people